Peter Fleming and John McEnroe were the defending champions but only McEnroe competed that year with Peter Rennert.

McEnroe and Rennert won in the final 6–3, 7–6 against Steve Denton and Mark Edmondson.

Seeds

  Peter McNamara /  Paul McNamee (first round)
  Steve Denton /  Mark Edmondson (final)
  Sherwood Stewart /  Ferdi Taygan (semifinals)
  John McEnroe /  Peter Rennert (champions)

Draw

External links
1982 Custom Credit Australian Indoor Championships Doubles Draw

Doubles